Air Conflicts: Pacific Carriers is a combat flight simulator video game set in the Pacific theater of World War II. It was developed by Games Farm, published by Maximum Games and bitComposer Games, and released on December 7, 2012 for Microsoft Windows, Xbox 360, and PlayStation 3. It was ported to Nintendo Switch as part of a collection with Air Conflicts: Secret Wars in March 2019.

This was a sequel to the original 2006 game known as Air Conflicts.
The game received mildly positive reviews. The graphics were praised, as was the initial, fun gameplay, but it was noted that the gameplay and music soon get repetitive.

References

2012 video games
World War II flight simulation video games
Video games developed in Slovakia
PlayStation 3 games
Xbox 360 games
Video games set in Australia
Video games set in Hawaii
Video games set in Japan
Video games set in Oceania
Video games set in the Marshall Islands
Video games set in Papua New Guinea
Video games set in the Philippines
Video games set in the Solomon Islands
Video games set in Sri Lanka
Video games set in the United States
Windows games
Pacific War video games
Nintendo Switch games
BitComposer Interactive games
Maximum Games games